Brkovic is a surname. Notable people with the surname include:

Ahmet Brković (born 1974), Croatian footballer
Balša Brković (born 1966), Montenegrin writer, essayist and theatre critic
Danijal Brković (born 1991), Bosnian-American footballer
Dragana Kršenković Brković, writer from Montenegro
Dušan Brković (born 1989), Serbian footballer
Jevrem Brković (born 1933), Montenegrin writer (poet, novelist, journalist), historian and a cultural activist
Mićo Brković (born 1968), cyclist
Irfan Brkovic (born 1986), Bosnian artist

See also 

 Brkić

Bosnian surnames
Serbian surnames